María Eugenia Trinchinetti (born 17 July 1997) is an Argentine field hockey player and part of the Argentina national team. She plays with the Argentina national field hockey team, winning silver medal at the 2020 Summer Olympics.

Career 
She won a gold medal at the 2019 Pan American Games.

References

1997 births
Living people
Las Leonas players
Argentine female field hockey players
Female field hockey defenders
Female field hockey midfielders
Field hockey players at the 2019 Pan American Games
Pan American Games medalists in field hockey
Pan American Games gold medalists for Argentina
Medalists at the 2019 Pan American Games
Field hockey players at the 2020 Summer Olympics
Olympic field hockey players of Argentina
Olympic silver medalists for Argentina
Medalists at the 2020 Summer Olympics
Olympic medalists in field hockey
Sportspeople from Entre Ríos Province
Competitors at the 2022 South American Games
South American Games silver medalists for Argentina
South American Games medalists in field hockey
21st-century Argentine women